Blushing Groom (8 April 1974 – 6 May 1992) was a French champion Thoroughbred racehorse and sire.

Background
He was bred by American businessman John McNamee Sullivan and was raced by HH Aga Khan IV. A descendant of Nearco, Blushing Groom was sired by Red God and out of the mare Runaway Bride. He was trained by François Mathet in France.

Racing record
Blushing Groom raced six times in 1976 at age two. He finished third in his debut, then won the next five races, including four Group One events, capturing the Prix Robert Papin, Prix Morny, Prix de la Salamandre, and  Grand Critérium. His performances earned him French Champion Two-Year-Old honors.

As a three-year-old, Blushing Groom extended his win streak to seven, winning the 1977 Prix de Fontainebleau and the GI Poule d'Essai des Poulains. Sent to England to compete in The Derby, he faced a 1½ mile challenge, a distance fifty percent longer than he had ever run before. He finished third to winner The Minstrel, a son of Northern Dancer. In his final race, Blushing Groom finished second in France's GI Prix Jacques Le Marois.

Stud record
Although Blushing Groom met with considerable success in racing, he became an even greater as a sire. He was sent to stand at  stud at Gainesway Farm in Lexington, Kentucky, where he sired winners at major tracks in Europe, North America, Australia, Japan, and Hong Kong. Like his sire Red God, Blushing Groom had been a champion miler but many of his offspring are renowned for their stamina and have been able to win consistently at longer distances.

Blushing Groom has sired 92 stakes winners. Some of his notable progeny includes:

 Arazi – won three GI races in France in 1991 plus the Breeders' Cup Juvenile, voted 1991 European Horse of the Year and United States Champion 2-Year-Old Colt
 Baillamont – won Prix Jean Prat, Prix Ganay, Prix d'Ispahan
 Blush With Pride – won the Kentucky Oaks
 Blushing John – won Poule d'Essai des Poulains, Hollywood Gold Cup, 1989 U.S. Eclipse Award for Outstanding Older Male Horse
 Candy Stripes – sire of 2005 American Champion Male Turf Horse, Leroidesanimaux, and 2006 American Horse of the Year, Invasor
 Crystal Glitters – won Prix d'Ispahan (1983 & 1984)
 Digamist – won Phoenix Stakes
 Gold Splash – won Coronation Stakes, Prix Marcel Boussac
 Groom Dancer – won Prix Lupin, sired Groom Tesse, Egerton 
 Nashwan – in 1989 won 2,000 Guineas, Eclipse Stakes, Epsom Derby, King George VI and Queen Elizabeth Stakes, sire of Bago, Swain
 Nassipour – won Canadian International Stakes, sired Let's Elope, Tie the Knot
 Rahy – sire of U.S. Racing Hall of Fame inductee Serena's Song, 2001 European Horse of the Year, Fantastic Light, Mariah's Storm, Noverre, Champion 3 yr old in England, and Dreaming of Anna, 2006 U.S. 2-Year-Old Champion Filly & Breeders' Cup Juvenile Fillies winner
 Rainbow Quest – won Prix de l'Arc de Triomphe, Coronation Cup, the Leading broodmare sire in Great Britain & Ireland in 2003 & 2004 
 Runaway Groom – Canadian Horse Racing Hall of Fame
 Sky Beauty – 1993 United States' Filly Triple Crown winner voted 1994 Champion Older Female
 Snow Bride – won Epsom Oaks

Among others, Blushing Groom is the grandsire of Tawrrific, Let's Elope, Cherokee Run, Silic, Subordination, Congaree, Leroidesanimaux, Tie the Knot, Swain, Dreaming of Anna, Bago and 2006 World Champion, Invasor. He is also the damsire of Awesome Again, Kahyasi, Lammtarra, Mayano Top Gun, 2000 Japanese Horse of the Year T M Opera O, and Goldikova.

Blushing Groom died in 1992 and is buried at Gainesway Farm in Lexington, Kentucky.

Pedigree

References
Notes

Sources
 Official website for Blushing Groom at AgaKhanStuds.com

1974 racehorse births
1992 racehorse deaths
Racehorses bred in France
Racehorses trained in France
British Champion Thoroughbred Sires
British Champion Thoroughbred broodmare sires
Thoroughbred family 22-d
Chefs-de-Race